The 2013–14 Central Arkansas Bears basketball team represented the University of Central Arkansas during the 2013–14 NCAA Division I men's basketball season. The Bears are led by interim head coach Clarence Finley and played their home games at the Farris Center. They were members of the Southland Conference. They finished the season 8–21, 5–13 in Southland play to finish in 11th place. They failed to qualify for the Southland Conference tournament.

On March 5, it was announced that UCA alumni Russ Pennell was announced as the team's new head coach for the following season.

Roster

Schedule

|-
!colspan=9 style="" | Regular season

References

Central Arkansas Bears basketball seasons
Central Arkansas
2013 in sports in Arkansas
2014 in sports in Arkansas